Morgan Cassius Fitzpatrick (October 29, 1868 – June 25, 1908) was an American politician and a member of the United States House of Representatives for the 4th congressional district of Tennessee.

Biography
Fitzpatrick was born on October 29, 1868 near Carthage, Tennessee in Smith County. He attended the common schools and Lebanon University, in Ohio, in 1887. In 1891, he graduated from the law department of Cumberland University in Lebanon, Tennessee. He was admitted to the bar the same year and commenced practice in Hartville, Tennessee. He also edited a newspaper at Hartville. In 1894 he married Maggie Mae De Bow.

Career
A member of the Tennessee House of Representatives, Fitzpatrick served from 1895 to 1899. He served as speaker in 1897, having been elected on the first ballot over A.H. Pettibone. He was the state superintendent of public instruction from 1899 to 1903. He was chairman of the state Democratic executive committee.

Fitzpatrick was elected as a Democrat to the Fifty-eighth Congress. He served from March 4, 1903 to March 3, 1905,  but he was not a candidate for renomination in 1904 and resumed the practice of law.

Death
Fitzpatrick died in Nashville, Tennessee on June 25, 1908 (age 39 years, 240 days). He is interred at Gallatin Cemetery in Gallatin, Tennessee.

References

External links
Tennessee State Library and Archives

Political Graveyard

1868 births
1908 deaths
Democratic Party members of the Tennessee House of Representatives
Democratic Party members of the United States House of Representatives from Tennessee
19th-century American politicians